TheWolfWeb, also known as TWW or T-dub, is an unofficial message board for North Carolina State University (NCSU), created by Jacob Morgan (CrazyJ).  TWW was the prototype for the "party in college" message boards, which provide an online community for a number of universities across the country. It was also a source of the codebase for TheCollegeWeb but is not part of that network despite the similarity of all of those sites to TWW. 

It serves as a source of local (Raleigh, NC) news, as frequently posting members of the message board will provide both eyewitness accounts and frequent updates on events in the area, ranging from vehicle accidents to on-campus crime and suicide events.  It has also been significant in transmitting many Internet memes through the NCSU student body (notably the terms pwnt, bwn, and FDT). 

On February 26, 2004, News 14 Carolina, now known as Spectrum News North Carolina, was subject to a prank by members of TheWolfWeb when it was discovered that the system used to report closings and delays for businesses, schools, and churches for inclement weather put submissions on the air without review.  Members of the message board exploited this fact to make fictitious business ranging from referencing All Your Base Are Belong To Us to containing lewd or obscene references be listed on the air during the channel's winter weather coverage.  After the exploit gained national attention, many news stations, News 14 Carolina included, implemented or enhanced their verification and vetting processes for listing closings and delays as to avoid a repeat of the incident.  

On June 16th 2016, the site went down suddenly and was down for approximately eight hours.  When it returned, ownership announced that the site was underwater and could possibly be shut down in a matter of days. Panic set in for the users, who called for the immediate resignation of Tom Dollins, The Wolf Web’s CEO at the time. Dollins resigned two days later, on June 18th, 2016, and then-CFO Henrico Flatchery was promoted to CEO. Flatchery’s vision led The Wolf Web into its current state, in what has been coined by regular users as “the glory days”.

TWW does not yet have a mobile app or mobile interface, but Flatchery has assigned a team of six software developers to the task. The mobile application (“TWW Mobile”) is expected to completed in late-2019.

References

External links
 TheWolfWeb
 North Carolina State University
 CyberJournalist article on the News 14 Carolina prank
 WolfWeb thread that originated the News 14 Carolina prank
 Racially charged comments on web postings upset NC State Students

North Carolina State University
Internet forums